Hector Burnard White (18 June 1900 – 9 June 1969) was an Australian politician who represented the South Australian House of Assembly seat of Murray from 1953 to 1956 for the Liberal and Country League.

In local politics, he was mayor of the Corporate Town of Murray Bridge from 1951 to 1956.

References

1900 births
1969 deaths
Members of the South Australian House of Assembly
Liberal and Country League politicians
20th-century Australian politicians
Mayors of places in South Australia